The Hollow is a 1946 detective novel by Agatha Christie.

The Hollow may also refer to:
 The Hollow (play), a 1951 play by Agatha Christie
 The Hollow (Charmed), a fictional entity in the television series Charmed

Film and television
The Hollow (1975 film), documentary film by George Nierenberg
 The Hollow (2004 film), a teen horror film
 The Hollow (2016 film), a crime drama film
 The Hollow (TV series), a Netflix original series from 2018

Music
 "The Hollow" (song), a 2000 song by A Perfect Circle
 The Hollow (album), a 2011 album by Memphis May Fire

Places
 The Hollow (Markham, Virginia), an historic property and dwelling near Markham, Fauquier County, Virginia
 The Hollow, Bridgeport, a neighborhood in the city of Bridgeport

See also 
Hollow (disambiguation)